Davide Fragnito (born 3 February 1996) is an Italian rugby union player. His usual position is as a Lock and he currently plays for Fiamme Oro in Top12.

In 2016–17 Pro12 and 2017–18 Pro14 seasons, Fragnito was named Additional Player for Zebre.

After playing for Italy Under 20 in 2015 and 2016, in 2017 and 2018 he also was named in the Emerging Italy squad.

References

External links 
It's Rugby England Profile
Ultimate Rugby Profile

Sportspeople from Benevento
Italian rugby union players
Zebre Parma players
1996 births
Living people
Rugby union locks
Fiamme Oro Rugby players